Eucalyptus bensonii, commonly known as Benson's stringybark, is a small tree or mallee that is endemic to New South Wales. It has rough grey or brown stringy bark on the trunk and larger branches, smooth bark on the thinnest branches, broadly lance-shaped to egg-shaped adult leaves, flower buds arranged in groups of seven, nine or eleven, white flowers and cup-shaped or hemispherical fruit in clusters.

Description
It has rough, grey or brown stringy bark on part or all of the trunak and larger branches, smooth grey bark above. Flowering occurs from November to January and the flowers are white.

Taxonomy and naming
Eucalyptus bensonii was first formally described in 1990 by Lawrie Johnson and Ken Hill near Mount Boonbourwa which is near Kandos. The description was published in the journal Telopea. The specific epithet (bensonii) honours Douglas Howard Benson, an ecologist with the National Herbarium of New South Wales.

Distribution and habitat
Benson's stringybark is only known from isolated occurrences in the Wollemi National Park between Rylstone and Glen Davis where it grows in heath on highland plateau areas.

References

bensonii
Myrtales of Australia
Flora of New South Wales
Trees of Australia
Plants described in 1990
Taxa named by Lawrence Alexander Sidney Johnson
Taxa named by Ken Hill (botanist)